Eugoa sexpuncta is a moth of the family Erebidae first described by George Hampson in 1911. It is found in Papua New Guinea.

References

sexpuncta
Moths described in 1911